Luděk Oppl (born 1888, date of death unknown) was a Czech fencer. He competed for Czechoslovakia in the team sabre competition at the 1924 Summer Olympics.

References

External links
 
 

1888 births
Year of death missing
Czechoslovak male fencers
Olympic fencers of Czechoslovakia
Fencers at the 1924 Summer Olympics